Daham Najim Bashir (born David Nyaga on 8 November 1979) is a Kenyan-born middle-distance runner now representing Qatar.

At the 2005 Bislett Games he set a new Asian record over one mile with 3:47.97 minutes. In 2006 he won a silver medal in 1500 metres at the 2006 Asian Indoor Athletics Championships before taking the gold medal at that distance at the 2006 Asian Games. He represented Qatar at the 2005 World Championships in Athletics and the 2008 Summer Olympics, finishing tenth both times.

References

External links
 

1979 births
Living people
Qatari male middle-distance runners
Kenyan male middle-distance runners
Olympic athletes of Qatar
Athletes (track and field) at the 2008 Summer Olympics
Asian Games medalists in athletics (track and field)
Athletes (track and field) at the 2006 Asian Games
World Athletics Championships athletes for Qatar
Kenyan emigrants to Qatar
Naturalised citizens of Qatar
Qatari people of Kenyan descent
Asian Games gold medalists for Qatar
Medalists at the 2006 Asian Games